Lejeune–BP was a French professional cycling team that existed from 1976 to 1978. Its sponsors were Cycles Lejeune and BP.
They are recorded as having 11 UCI wins.

References

External links

Cycling teams based in France
Defunct cycling teams based in France
1978 establishments in France
1976 disestablishments in France
Cycling teams established in 1976
Cycling teams disestablished in 1978